X-Faktor is a Hungarian television music competition to find new singing talent. The seventh series aired on RTL Klub in 2017.  Instead of Bence Istenes in Season 7, Kiss Ramona will be the new show host. ByeAlex, Laci Gáspár, Peti Puskás remained in the jury in the 7th season. After 3 years Gabi Tóth, left X-FaKtor, and was replaced by Gigi Radics. Ricco & Claudia won the competition and they became the first group to win the show and also they became the first foreign act to win the show.

Judges' houses
The Judges' houses episodes aired on 7 October and 8 October 2017. As opposed to previous seasons, this was not the place for guest speakers, but every mentor listened to the performances of the four categories, then the mentor of that category would automatically choose two contestants for the live shows and leave one more contestant for the other three mentors to choose. The Hungarian X-Factor is the first where this format is used.

The twelve eliminated acts were:
Boys:  Martin Barna, Dániel Bereznay, Pál Kovács
Girls: Boglárka Izsó, Anna Lengyel, Szandra Klarissza Oláh
Over 25s: Snjezana Pecija, Dezső Rékasi, David Vardanov
Groups: Catchy Workshop, Florián Kvintett, M&M

Contestants
Key:
 – Winner
 – Runner-Up
 – Third place
 – Withdrawn

At the X-Factor press conference on October 11, Krisztián Nagy announced that he was withdrawing from the competition due to difficulties he was having during the preparation period. He was replaced by Daniel Bereznay.

Results summary
{|
|-
| – mentored by ByeAlex (Girls)
|| – Bottom two/three
|-
| – mentored by Gigi Radics (Boys)
| – Safe
|-
| – mentored by Laci Gáspár (Groups)
| – Eliminated by SMS vote
|-
| – mentored by Peti Puskás (Over 25s)
|}

Live Shows

Week 1 (14 October)
 Celebrity performer: Gabi Tóth ("Ízedre vágyom")
 Group performance: "Love and Bass"/"Bababo"

Judge's vote to eliminate
 Gáspár: Péter Hegedűs
 Puskás: London Kids
 Radics: London Kids
 ByeAlex: Péter Hegedűs

With each act receiving two votes, the result was reverted to the earlier public vote. Péter Hegedűs received the fewest votes and was eliminated.

Week 2 (21 October)

Judge's vote to eliminate
 Gáspár: Viola Erdős
 ByeAlex: London Kids
 Puskás: London Kids
 Radics: London Kids

Week 3 (28 October)
 Celebrity performer: Dóra Danics ("A nagylány vidám")

Judge's vote to eliminate
 ByeAlex: Lívia Abaházi Nagy
 Radics: Viola Erdős
 Puskás: Viola Erdős
 Gáspár: Lívia Abaházi Nagy

With each act receiving two votes, the result was reverted to the earlier public vote. Viola Erdős received the fewest votes and was eliminated.

Week 4 (4 November)

Judge's vote to eliminate
 ByeAlex: Lívia Abaházi Nagy
 Radics: Lívia Abaházi Nagy
 Gáspár: Dániel Berta
 Puskás: Lívia Abaházi Nagy

Week 5 (11 November)
 Theme: One Hungarian song and one English song

Judge's vote to eliminate
 ByeAlex: Dániel Berta
 Radics: Dániel Berta
 Puskás: Bettina Tóth
 Gáspár: Dániel Berta

Week 6 (18 November)

Judge's vote to eliminate
 ByeAlex: Roland Gulyás
 Radics: Bettina Tóth
 Puskás: Roland Gulyás
 Gáspár: Bettina Tóth
With each act receiving two votes, the result was reverted to the earlier public vote. Bettina Tóth received the fewest votes and was eliminated.

Week 7 Final (25 November)
 Theme: mentor's choice, a duet with mentor, contestant's choice, winner's single

2017 Hungarian television seasons
Hungary 07